Winx Club is an animated series co-produced by Rainbow SpA and later Nickelodeon. It was created by Italian animator Iginio Straffi. The show is set in a magical universe that is inhabited by fairies, witches, and other mythical creatures. The main character is a fairy warrior named Bloom, who enrolls at Alfea College to train and hone her skills. The series uses a serial format that has an ongoing storyline. It premiered on 28 January 2004, becoming a ratings success in Italy and on Nickelodeon networks internationally.

Iginio Straffi initially outlined the show's plot to last three seasons. He chose to continue the story for a fourth season in 2009. Around this time, Winx Clubs popularity attracted the attention of the American media company Viacom, owner of Nickelodeon. Viacom purchased 30% of the show's animation studio, RainbowSpA, and Nickelodeon began producing a revival series. Production on the fifth, sixth, and seventh seasons was divided between Rainbow and Nickelodeon Animation Studio. To attract an American audience, Viacom assembled a voice cast of Nickelodeon actors (including Elizabeth Gillies and Ariana Grande), invested  in advertising for the series, and inducted Winx Club into Nickelodeon's franchise of Nicktoons.

Beginning in 2010, episodes of Winx Club were jointly written with Nickelodeon's American team. Nickelodeon's writers aimed to make the series multicultural and appealing toward viewers from different countries. In 2019, Straffi commented on his years of collaboration with Nickelodeon, saying that "the know-how of Rainbow and the know-how of Nickelodeon are very complementary; the sensibilities of the Americans, with our European touch." The continued partnership between Rainbow and Nickelodeon on Winx Club led to the development of more co-productions, including Club 57 in 2019, on which much of Winx Clubs staff worked.

The series was subject to budget cuts in 2014, during its seventh season. The 3D computer-generated segments and Hollywood voice actors were deemed too costly to keep using. The seventh season eventually premiered on Nickelodeon's worldwide channels in 2015. After a four-year hiatus, an eighth season premiered in 2019. At Straffi's decision, this season was retooled for a preschool target audience. Most of the show's longtime crew members were not called back to work on season 8. Straffi stepped away from the series at this time, shifting his focus to Club 57 and other live-action projects. A live-action adaptation of Winx Club for young adults, titled Fate: The Winx Saga, premiered in 2021.

Premise 

The series follows the adventures of a group of girls known as the Winx, students at the Alfea College for Fairies, who turn into fairies to fight villains. The team is made up of Bloom, the fairy of the Dragon Flame ; Stella, the fairy of the Shining Sun; Flora, the fairy of nature; Tecna, the fairy of technology; Musa, the fairy of music; and Aisha, the fairy of waves. The main male characters are called the Specialists, a group of students at the Red Fountain school who are also the Winx fairies' boyfriends. They include Bloom's boyfriend Sky; Stella's boyfriend Brandon; Flora's boyfriend Helia; Tecna's boyfriend Timmy; and Musa's boyfriend Riven. Unlike their female counterparts, the Specialists do not have magical powers and instead train how to fight using laser weapons. The Winx and Specialists' most common adversaries are a trio of witches named the Trix: Icy, Darcy, and Stormy, all former students of the Cloud Tower school.

Winx Club is set in a vast universe that has several dimensions. Most episodes take place in the Magic Dimension, which is closed off to ordinary people and inhabited by creatures from European mythology like fairies, witches, and monsters. The capital of this world is the city of Magix—which is located on the planet of the same name—where the three main magic schools are situated. The other planets of the Magic Dimension include Bloom's home planet Domino, Stella's home planet Solaria, Flora's home planet Lynphea, Tecna's home planet Zenith, Musa's home planet Melody, and Aisha's home planet Andros. Some episodes take place on Earth, where Bloom spent her childhood.

Episodes

Development

Concept and creation 

During the 1990s, comic artist Iginio Straffi noticed that most action cartoons focused on male heroes; at the time, he felt that the "cartoon world was devoid of female characters." Straffi hoped to introduce an alternative show with a female lead aged 16 to 18, as he wanted to "explore the psychological side" of the transition to adulthood. He decided to develop a pilot centred on the conflict between two rival colleges; one for fairies and another for witches. Straffi compared his original premise to "a sort of 'Oxford–Cambridge rivalry' in a magical dimension". In expanding the concept, Iginio Straffi drew his inspiration from Japanese manga and the comics of Sergio Bonelli.

Straffi's pilot, which was titled "Magic Bloom," featured the original five Winx members in attires like those of traditional European fairies. It was produced during a twelve-month development period that included animation tests, character studies, and market surveys. The animation attracted the interest of Rai Fiction, which paid for 25% of the production cost in exchange for Italian broadcast rights and a share of the series' revenue over 15 years. After holding test screenings of the pilot, however, Straffi was unhappy with the audience's unenthusiastic reaction to the characters' outdated clothing style and stated that the pilot did not satisfy him. In a 2016 interview, Straffi said the result "looked like just another Japanese-style cartoon ... but nothing like [the modern] Winx".

To rework the concept, Straffi's team hired Italian fashion designers to restyle the show and give the characters a brighter, more modern appearance. Production of the restyled series began by 2002, and Rainbow estimated the episodes would be delivered to distributors by late 2003. The new name of the series ("Winx") was derived from the English word "wings". Straffi's aim was to appeal to both genders, including action sequences designed for male viewers and fashion elements for female viewers. At the October 2003 MIPCOM event, Rainbow screened the show's first episode to international companies. The first season had its world premiere on Italian television channel Rai 2 on 28 January 2004.

From the beginning of development, Iginio Straffi planned an overarching plot that would end after "a maximum" of 78 episodes. Straffi stated that the Winx saga "would not last forever" in 2007, and he intended the first movie (Winx Club: The Secret of the Lost Kingdom) to resolve any plot points remaining from the third-season finale. In 2008, Straffi decided to extend the series, citing its increasing popularity.

Nickelodeon revival 

In February 2011, the American company Viacom (owner of Nickelodeon) became a co-owner of the Rainbow studio; Viacom bought 30% of Rainbow for 62 million euros (US$83 million). Viacom originally planned to buy out the entire Rainbow studio but wanted to keep Iginio Straffi at the helm, leaving Straffi with 70%. Coinciding with the purchase, Viacom announced that Nickelodeon would team up with the original creator on an "all-new Winx Club" revival series. Viacom financed and staffed the revived series, dividing production between Viacom's Nickelodeon Animation Studio in the United States and Rainbow in Italy. Nickelodeon Consumer Products secured merchandising rights to the revival in some regions including the United States.

The revived series began with four special episodes that summarize the first two seasons of the original show, followed by the fifth, sixth, and seventh seasons. As the production team was divided between two countries, Nickelodeon released a statement commenting on how Winx Club was an unusual production for the company: "it's not our usual practice to co-produce cartoons; we make them by ourselves. But we strongly believe in Winx." Along with another brand revival (Teenage Mutant Ninja Turtles), Winx Club was officially inducted into Nickelodeon's franchise of Nicktoons, a brand that encompasses original animated productions created for the network. On each episode of the revived series, Nickelodeon approved scripts and all phases of animation. Nickelodeon brought on some of its long-time staff members, such as creative director Janice Burgess, and writers Sascha Paladino, Adam Peltzman, and Carin Greenberg.

On 7 April 2014, Rainbow and Nickelodeon announced their continuing partnership on the seventh season of Winx Club, with a planned premiere date of 2015. Straffi said of the season: "It will be a privilege to partner once more with Nickelodeon on this." During this season's production, Rainbow was undergoing a multimillion-euro financial loss due to the box office failure of its film Gladiators of Rome. This made them cut costs on Winx Club, its most expensive show. The CGI-animated segments and California voice cast from the previous two seasons were deemed too costly to continue using for season 7. As with the previous two seasons, the copyright to season 7 is co-owned by Rainbow and Viacom. The first episode aired on 22 June 2015, on Nickelodeon in Asia, followed by its American broadcast on the Nick Jr. channel on 10 January 2016.

The president of Nickelodeon International, Pierluigi Gazzolo, was responsible for arranging the co-production partnership and became a member of Rainbow's board of directors (a role he continues to serve in, as of November 2019). In addition to financing the television series, Viacom provided the resources necessary to produce a third Winx film. In 2019, Iginio Straffi commented on the two studios' near-decade of continued work together, saying that "the know-how of Rainbow and the know-how of Nickelodeon are very complementary; the sensibilities of the Americans, with our European touch." Winx Club opened the opportunity for Nickelodeon and Rainbow to collaborate on additional co-productions together, including various pilots from 2014 onward and Club 57 in 2019.

Retooled eighth season 

The eighth season of the series was not produced immediately after the seventh. It followed a multiple-year hiatus and was not made as a direct continuation of the previous season. At Iginio Straffi's decision, Season 8 was heavily retooled to appeal to a preschool target audience.

For season 8, Rainbow's creative team restyled the characters to appear younger, hoping to increase the appeal toward preschoolers. The plot lines were simplified so that they could be understood by a younger audience. Most of the show's longtime crew members were not called back to work on this season, including art director Simone Borselli, who had designed the series' characters from season 1 to 7, and singer Elisa Rosselli, who had performed a majority of the songs. In another change from previous seasons, Nickelodeon's American team served as consultants rather than directly overseeing the episodes; at the time, Nickelodeon was instead working with Rainbow on a new co-production, Club 57. Season 8 was also the first-ever season without the involvement of Rai Fiction.

Iginio Straffi made the decision to shift the show's intended audience after years of gradually aiming toward a younger demographic. In a 2019 interview, Straffi explained that decreasing viewership from older viewers and an increased audience of young children made this change a necessity. He elaborated that "the fans of the previous Winx Club say on social media that the new seasons are childish, but they don't know that we had to do that." Straffi stepped away from the series at this time and did not oversee season 8's production like he had for the previous installments. He instead shifted his focus to live-action projects aimed at older audiences: Nickelodeon's Club 57 and Fate: The Winx Saga. Straffi explained that "the things we had to tone down [in season 8] have been emphasized in the live action–the relationships, the fights, the love stories." He added that he hopes that Fate will satisfy the "20-year-olds who still like to watch Winx."

Production

Design 

The series' visuals are a mixture of Japanese anime and European elements, which Iginio Straffi calls "the trademark Rainbow style". The main characters' original designs were based on Straffi's original sketches and later updated to 3D CGI iterations. The main characters were modelled on celebrities popular at the turn of the 21st century. In a 2011 interview with IO Donna, Straffi stated that Britney Spears served as an inspiration for Bloom, Cameron Diaz for Stella, Jennifer Lopez for Flora, Pink for Tecna, Lucy Liu for Musa, and Beyoncé for Aisha. This approach was part of Straffi's aim for the fairies to represent "the women of today."

A team of specialized artists designs the characters' expressions and outfits for each season. About 20 tables of expressions and positions from all angles are drawn for each character. The designers start to develop characters' costumes by creating collages from magazine clippings of recent fashion trends. Using these as references, they draw multiple outfits for each character. Simone Borselli, the series' art director, designed most of the characters' early-season clothing despite lacking a background in fashion design. When asked by an interviewer where his fashion intuition came from, Borselli responded, "From being gay."

Writing and animation 
The first stage in the production of an episode is developing its script, a process that can last 5–6 months. When the series began production, the writers were based entirely in Italy. After Viacom became a co-owner of Rainbow in 2011, Rainbow's group of 30 writers began collaborating with teams in both Italy and the United States. The international coordination, which has continued through 2019, intends to make scenarios depicted in the program multicultural and accessible to viewers from different countries. Episodes are written with two stories in mind: a longer narrative arc that lasts for tens of episodes and a subplot that concludes at the end of the 22-minute runtime. This episode structure was modelled on those of teen dramas and American comics. Themes written into the series include romance, the acquisition of maturity upon reaching adulthood, and (in the fifth season) nature conservation.

After the script and character designs have been approved, the screenplay is passed onto a group of storyboard artists. For each 22-minute episode, the artists prepare 450 pages of storyboards which are used to assemble an animatic. At this stage, dialogue and music are added to determine the length of each scene. In the original series (seasons 1–4), the characters' mouths were animated to match the Italian voice actors' lines; in the revived series, the mouth movements were matched to the English scripts. Episodes are worked on concurrently because each requires around two years of work to complete.

At the beginning of the first season, the production team worked from Rainbow's original headquarters in Recanati. In 2006, Straffi opened a second studio in Rome for computer-animated projects. During the fifth and sixth seasons, 3D CGI sequences were incorporated into the series for the first time, animated at the studio in Rome. According to the Rainbow CGI animators, the animation of the characters' hair in underwater scenes was particularly difficult, and it was animated separately from the characters.

Casting 
In Italy, the series' voice actors include Letizia Ciampa (Bloom), Perla Liberatori (Stella), Ilaria Latini (Flora), Domitilla D'Amico (Tecna), Gemma Donati (Musa), and Laura Lenghi (Aisha). According to Ilaria Latini, the characters were cast before the character designs were finalized and the actors were shown black-and-white sketches of their roles. The actors record their lines in Rome. Seasons 1–4 were animated to match the Italian voices. Starting with season 5, the animation was synchronized to match the English scripts.

The 2011 specials introduced a new cast of Hollywood voice actors. Iginio Straffi himself helped to choose the voices of the main characters, and the actors recorded their lines at the Atlas Oceanic studio in Burbank, California. Molly Quinn voiced the lead role of Bloom, and at first, she tried out a cartoony voice for her character. Nickelodeon advised her to use her real voice instead, saying, "No, we want voices of real girls this time around."

For the 2011 cast, Viacom hired popular actors whose names were advertised on-air to attract American viewers; these stars included Ariana Grande as Diaspro, Elizabeth Gillies as Daphne, Keke Palmer as Aisha, Matt Shively as Sky, and Daniella Monet as Mitzi. These actors provided voices for the first two Winx films and seasons three through six. In 2014, Viacom relocated the series' English cast to DuArt in New York City; this was done as a cost-cutting and time-saving measure since Rainbow was undergoing a significant financial loss at the time. Despite the change in voice actors, the series' animation continued to be matched to Nickelodeon and Rainbow's English scripts for the seventh season.

Music 
Original songs have been recorded in about 40 languages for the show. Frequent composers for the program include Michele Bettali, Stefano Carrara, Fabrizio Castania, and Maurizio D'Aniello. One of Nickelodeon's composers, Emmy and Grammy Award recipient Peter Zizzo, joined the team during Nickelodeon's joint production of the fifth season. His music is featured in the fifth, sixth, and seventh seasons. Each song takes between five and twelve months to complete. Many of the show's tracks are performed by Italian singer Elisa Rosselli, who started recording songs for Winx in 2007. Rosselli continued to produce music for the show (usually in collaboration with D'Aniello or Peter Zizzo from Nickelodeon) until its seventh season.

Nickelodeon created a few live-action music videos for Winx Club that were performed by stars from other Nick shows. One featured Elizabeth Gillies from Victorious (who also voiced Bloom's sister, Daphne) singing "We Are Believix." This song was released as a stand-alone single on iTunes. Another music video featured Cymphonique Miller from How to Rock singing "Winx, You're Magic Now." Miller also did a live performance of her Winx song at Nickelodeon's upfront presentation in Las Vegas.

Broadcast 
Winx Club first premiered on the Italian television channel Rai 2 on 28 January 2004. Reruns later aired on Rai Gulp, a sister channel to Rai 2 aimed at children, shortly after the network launched in 2007.

By 2014, the show had been aired in over 150 countries. In 2019, after the Viacom-CBS merger announcement, Informa's Television Business International listed the show among the most important Viacom properties internationally.

In June 2022, Paramount (the rebranded name of ViacomCBS) launched a 24-hour Winx Club channel on their Pluto TV on-demand service. The channel is currently only available on the Spanish and French feeds.

Revival series
On 2 September 2010, Nickelodeon announced through a press release that they would be producing brand-new seasons with Rainbow. Nickelodeon debuted four one-hour specials (also co-produced with Rainbow) summarizing the first two seasons, the first of which premiered on their flagship American channel on 27 June 2011. With the exception of Italy, the fifth, sixth, and seventh seasons launched on Nickelodeon channels domestically and internationally.

During the sixth season in 2014, episode premieres were moved from Rai 2 to Rai Gulp in Italy, and from Nickelodeon to Nick Jr. in the United States. The change to younger-skewing networks followed Rainbow's lowering of Winx Clubs target demographic to a younger audience than the earlier seasons. The seventh season was jointly announced by Nickelodeon and Rainbow in April 2014 as part of their continuing partnership. The seventh season made its world premiere on Nickelodeon Greece on 24 May 2015, and the English version debuted on Nickelodeon Asia on 22 June 2015. It later premiered on Rai Gulp in Italy (21 September 2015) and Nick Jr. in the United States (10 January 2016).

4Kids edit
In October 2003, 4Kids Entertainment acquired US broadcast rights to the first season of Winx Club for broadcast on their Fox Box (later 4Kids TV) strand on Fox. 4Kids redubbed the first three seasons, censoring and editing the original content in an attempt at localization. Iginio Straffi criticized these adjustments in a 2008 interview, saying, "The Winx fairies cannot even talk about boys there. I think this removes something essential." The series last aired on The CW (as part of The CW4Kids) before 4Kids' broadcast agreement was permanently revoked by Rainbow in 2009.

Reception

Ratings 
Upon its debut, Winx Club was a ratings success. During its first season in 2004, the series became one of the highest-rated programs on Rai 2 with an average audience share of 17%. Among viewers 4–14 years old, the average share was 45%. In France and Belgium, the season reached a 56% share among 10 to 14-year-olds. According to Rai in 2009, the gender mix of Winx Club audience was nearly equal across the first three seasons; in the target demographic of 4–14 years of age, females represented only 3% more of the audience than males. The premiere of the fourth season set a record for an animated show's audience on Rai 2 with 500,000 viewers. In 2007, Iginio Straffi noted that there were lower ratings in English-speaking territories than in Europe at the time, which he surmised was due to cultural differences.

On 27 June 2011, the first special produced with Nickelodeon premiered on Nick U.S. to 2.278 million viewers. Each of the following three specials performed better than the previous ones, with the fourth ("The Shadow Phoenix") rating #1 in its time slot among viewers aged 2–11. During the first quarter of 2012, an average of 38.5 million viewers watched the series across nine of Nickelodeon's international outlets, a 60% increase from the fourth quarter of 2011. On Nickelodeon UK, Winx Club increased the network's ratings by 58% on its launch weekend in September 2011, ranking as the second-most-popular program on the channel and the most popular show with females aged 7–15. As of 2021, Winx Club is still broadcast daily on Nickelodeon UK's main network.

Critical response 
In a New York Times article, Bocconi University professor Paola Dubini stated that the themes and characters of Winx Club appealed to both the target audience and their parents. Dubini wrote that the fairies' "defined and different personalities" made them relatable to viewers. Common Sense Media reviewer Tara Swords gave the show a three-star review, calling it "an imaginative story with bold, take-charge heroines" while also arguing that the show is hindered by its design elements.

Winx Club has attracted academic interest for its presentation of gender roles. In the journal of Volgograd State University, Russian sociologists Georgiy Antonov and Elena Laktyukhina judged that female characters in the series are depicted as dominant, while males are shown to be passive. As examples of women adopting traditionally male roles, they listed the female fairies fighting for their boyfriends, saving them from enemies, and inviting them on dates, while at the same time having difficulty performing household duties like cooking and cleaning. Writing for Kabardino-Balcarian State University, Zalina Dokhova and Tatiana Cheprakova stated that the series conveys "both positive and negative stereotypes", citing the opposite personalities of Stella and Aisha. They wrote that Stella's character incorporates stereotypically feminine passions for shopping and clothes, while Aisha represents a more realistic character with an interest in male-dominated sports.

Rhodes University professor Jeanne Prinsloo wrote in 2014 that Winx Club episodes "present complex narratives with active female protagonists and positive relationships that validate 'girl power'". In an interview with the newspaper Corriere della Sera, psychotherapist Gianna Schelotto highlighted positive aspects of the show, like friendship, guiding female viewers "away from supermodels to which the commercial world drags them". IlSole 24 Ore also wrote positively about the show's feminist themes, commending how the characters "expose narcissistic masculinity".

The characters' outfits caused some controversy in June 2017, when the Pakistan Electronic Media Regulatory Authority (PEMRA) fined Nickelodeon's Pakistani channel after it aired an episode where the Winx are shown in swimsuits.

Cultural impact 

Winx Club has been popular at fan conventions. For example, in 2012 and 2013, the series had a large presence at Nickelodeon's San Diego Comic-Con booth, where new collectibles were raffled off to fans. Nickelodeon made two exclusive dolls for the 2012 event (a silver Bloom and a gold Bloom) and two more for 2013 (Daphne in her nymph form and Bloom in her Harmonix form). In 2015, a four-day Winx Club fan gathering was held in Jesolo, where Nickelodeon installed a "Fan Wall" to display messages from worldwide fans. In October 2018, an exhibition for the series' fifteenth anniversary was held at Europe's largest comics festival, the Lucca Comics & Games convention in Tuscany.

Federico Vercellino of Il Sole 24 Ore described the series as "a destructive and constructive phenomenon" that introduced viewers to feminist stories about rebellious female characters. A 2019 study conducted for the Corriere della Sera reported that Winx Club was the fourth-most-popular Italian series outside of the country, with strong demand in Russia and the United States.

In 2018, Giovanna Gallo of Cosmopolitan stated that the program's characters have become "real icons of fashion" and noted the show's popularity with cosplayers, performance artists who wear costumes and accessories to represent the show's characters. Winx Club costumes were the focus of a second-season episode of The Apprentice, in which Flavio Briatore challenged the show's teams to create three Winx outfits intended for females 25–35 years of age, which were to be submitted to the judgment of Iginio Straffi. la Repubblicas Marina Amaduzzi attributed the popularity of Winx-inspired fashion to fans' desire to emulate the characters, stating that "Winx fanatics dress, move and breathe like their heroines".

The Regional Council of Marche, Italy, chose the Winx Club fairies to represent Marche and Italy at the Expo 2010 world's fair in Shanghai. A four-minute video using stereoscopic technology showing the Winx in Marche's tourist destinations was animated for the Italian Pavilion. In 2015, Italian Prime Minister Matteo Renzi visited Rainbow's studio and wrote that "the Winx are a beautiful story of Italian talent".

Lawsuit 
In April 2004, The Walt Disney Company filed an unsuccessful copyright infringement lawsuit against Rainbow. The company accused Rainbow of copying the Winx Club concept from its W.I.T.C.H. comic book, which was published over a year after production on Winx Club began. Disney applied for an injunction order to halt the further release of the Winx Club series and comic magazine; to declare the Winx Club trademark invalid; and to seize the periodical and film material bearing the allegedly infringing Winx Club name. Rainbow won the case against Disney, and the judge declared there were no confusing similarities between the two. Straffi mentioned that the Winx Club pilot entered production by 2000, while the W.I.T.C.H. comic was not released until May 2001. On 2 August 2004, all of Disney's infringement claims were rejected by the Tribunale di Bologna's Specialized Commercial Matters Department, which deemed them unfounded. The suit later became the subject of a commercial law seminar at the University of Macerata in 2009.

In 2005, Iginio Straffi was interviewed in IO Donna about the legal battle. He was asked how it felt "to be one of Disney's most hated people," and answered that he—as the founder of a small animation studio—was glad to have "defeated" a massive conglomerate. "I feel a certain pride in having annoyed such a giant. It's inspiring," he elaborated. As a result of the lawsuit, Straffi has avoided doing any business with the Disney corporation; he commented in 2014, "They've lost the chance to explore our creativity."

Related media

Films

The Secret of the Lost Kingdom 

On 8 October 2006, a Winx Club feature film was announced on Rainbow's website. The Secret of the Lost Kingdom was released in Italy on 30 November 2007. Its television premiere was on 11 March 2012 on Nickelodeon in the United States. The plot takes place after the events of the first three seasons, following Bloom as she searches for her birth parents and fights the Ancestral Witches who destroyed her home planet. Iginio Straffi had planned this feature-length story since the beginning of the series' development.

Magical Adventure 

On 9 November 2009, a sequel film was announced. Winx Club 3D: Magical Adventure was released in Italy on 29 October 2010. Its television premiere was on 20 May 2013, on Nickelodeon in the United States. In the film, Sky proposes to Bloom, but Sky's father does not approve of their marriage. Production on Magical Adventure began in 2007, while the first film was still in development. It is the first Italian film animated in stereoscopic 3D.

On February 19, 2013, Nickelodeon held a special screening of the movie at the TCL Chinese Theatre in Hollywood. Nickelodeon star Daniella Monet (who voiced Bloom's rival, Mitzi, on the show) and creator Iginio Straffi both attended the premiere.

The Mystery of the Abyss 

In late 2010, it was announced that Viacom (the owner of Nickelodeon and eventual co-owner of Rainbow) would provide the resources necessary to produce a new Winx film. The film, titled Winx Club: The Mystery of the Abyss, was released in Italy on 4 September 2014. It made its television premiere on Nickelodeon Germany on 8 August 2015. The plot follows the Winx venturing through the Infinite Ocean to rescue Sky, who has been imprisoned by the Trix. According to Iginio Straffi, the film has a more comedic tone than the previous two films.

Spin-offs 
PopPixie is a miniseries that ran for a single season over two months in 2011. It features chibi-inspired Pixie characters who were first introduced in the second season of Winx Club. After Nickelodeon became a co-developer of the main series, it was announced that PopPixie would air on Nickelodeon's global network of channels beginning in late 2011.

World of Winx is a spin-off series that premiered in 2016. Straffi described it as one "with more adult graphics, a kind of story better suited to an older audience" than the original series. It features the Winx travelling to Earth on an undercover mission to track down a kidnapper known as the Talent Thief. 26 episodes over two seasons were made.

Netflix live-action adaptation 

In 2018, a live-action adaptation aimed at young adults was announced. Filming began in September 2019, with Abigail Cowen starring as Bloom. The series made its world premiere on 22 January 2021, following a teaser released on 10 December 2020.

The writers of Fate: The Winx Saga were entirely new to the Winx franchise, and they were recruited from teen dramas like The Vampire Diaries. Early in production, Nickelodeon's American crew members from the cartoon (including Bloom's voice actress, Molly Quinn) met with the Fate production team and reviewed the pilot script. Rainbow's Joanne Lee also oversaw the show as an executive producer.

Reboot
A supposed ninth season of Winx Club was slated to be released sometime in 2021 or 2022, as revealed by the Licensing Summit Online in Russia on September 16, 2020; the show's seasonal format was to be changed to 52 episodes, each of 13 minutes length, as opposed to the 26 22-minute long episodes from all the previous seasons. The series' title was also set to be altered to Winx Club Shorts to suit this new episode format, with artwork of a new CGI artstyle for the series being promoted at licensing summits in late 2021, revealing the new show’s character designs.

On November 6, 2022, creator Iginio Straffi revealed on his Instagram that a CGI animated reboot of Winx Club was going to enter production; licensed under the "Season 9" name, it will not be a continuation of the previous eight. According to Straffi, the reboot will bring the series back to its roots, describing it as a "real" reboot of the series. The reboot is also set to maintain the 26 episodes format, as the "Shorts" concept was deemed unsuccessful. Merchandise and marketing materials for the reboot officially began to appear in international markets in 2023. In addition to the new series, a new live-action feature film is also in development. In January 2023, Straffi acquired all shares of Rainbow S.p.a., leaving both Paramount and Nickelodeon’s involvement in both international distribution and as a whole unknown.

Other live events 
In September 2005, a live stage musical called "Winx Power Show" began touring in Italy. The musical later expanded to other European countries and the show's cast performed at the 2007 Nickelodeon Kids' Choice Awards in Milan. An ice show follow-up starring Carolina Kostner was launched in November 2008. In October 2012, Nickelodeon held a live event at the Odeon Cinema Covent Garden, complete with a "pink carpet" and previews of upcoming episodes.

Merchandise 
Iginio Straffi opened up to licensing Winx Club merchandise in order to finance his studio's other projects; in 2008, he stated that he reinvests "almost everything" back into Rainbow. Across the show's first ten years on air, more than 6,000 pieces of tie-in merchandise were released by external licensing companies. As of 2014, Winx Club merchandise licenses generated around  annually, with most of the revenue going toward product licensees rather than Rainbow itself. According to a VideoAge International article, Rainbow's take from merchandise sales averages 10 percent, with some deals only giving the studio five percent.

After Viacom became a co-owner of Rainbow in 2011, Nickelodeon & Viacom Consumer Products started to create merchandise for the show. From 2011 to 2013, Nickelodeon spent  on a Winx Club marketing campaign to promote both the show and the tie-in products. Nickelodeon partnered with Jakks Pacific to design dolls based on new episodes, and in the United Kingdom, the merchandise sold out before those episodes had even premiered. Nickelodeon's vice president of consumer products, Michael Connolly, said that "Winx has been a huge surprise, considering the program is not on free-to-air in the UK. We put toys in Argos [stores] and in just three days we experienced sales for a doll range unlike we've seen."

An ongoing comic book series has been published since the series' premiere. Over 210 Italian issues have been released as of 2021. In the United States, Viz Media translated a few of the first 88 issues and released them across nine volumes. Other tie-in books have been produced, starting with character guides distributed by Giunti Editore. In 2012, Nickelodeon partnered with Random House to publish Winx Club books in English.

Games 

Several video games based on the show have been made, with some exclusive to Europe. The first game was Konami Europe's Winx Club in 2005. In 2012, Nickelodeon launched Winx Club: Magical Fairy Party for the Nintendo DS in both the United States and Europe. The Nickelodeon game was notable for being one of very few Nintendo DS titles to be played sideways, with the game system held like a book. A physical trading card game based on the franchise and produced by Upper Deck Entertainment was released in 2005.

Nickelodeon's website, Nick.com, created various Flash games based on the show. The Winx Club section on Nick.com became one of the most-visited pages on the site, with 1 million monthly visitors in mid-2013 and over 2.6 million gaming sessions.

Notes

References

External links

 
 Winx Club at Nick.com 
 Winx Club at NickAnimationStudio.com
 

 
2000s American comedy-drama television series
2000s Italian television series
2000s animated comedy television series
2000s American animated television series
2004 American television series debuts
2004 Italian television series debuts
2007 American television series endings
2009 Italian television series endings
2010s American animated television series
2010s American comedy-drama television series
2010s Italian television series
2010s Nickelodeon original programming
2010s animated comedy television series
2011 American television series debuts
2012 Italian television series debuts
2016 American television series endings
2019 Italian television series endings
American children's animated action television series
American children's animated adventure television series
American children's animated drama television series
American children's animated fantasy television series
American television series revived after cancellation
Anime-influenced Western animated television series
Fairies and sprites in popular culture
Fairies
Fantasy comics
Fashion dolls
Fictional fairies and sprites
Italian children's animated action television series
Italian children's animated adventure television series
Italian children's animated drama television series
Italian children's animated fantasy television series
Italian comics titles
Italian flash animated television series
Magical girl television series
Nicktoons
Paramount Global franchises
Teen animated television series
Television about magic
Television series by Rainbow S.r.l.
Television series created by Iginio Straffi
Television series revived after cancellation
Television shows adapted into comics
Television shows adapted into films
Television shows adapted into plays
Television shows adapted into video games
Italian-language television shows
English-language television shows